A microframework is a term used to refer to minimalistic web application frameworks. It is contrasted with full-stack frameworks.

It lacks most of the functionality which is common to expect in a full-fledged web application framework, such as:
 Accounts, authentication, authorization, roles
 Database abstraction via an object-relational mapping
 Input validation and input sanitation
 Web template engine

Typically, a microframework facilitates receiving an HTTP request, routing the HTTP request to the appropriate function and returning an HTTP response. Microframeworks are often specifically designed for building the APIs for another service or application.  For example, Lumen microframework is designed for microservices development and API development.

Pseudocode example 

require "foo.php";

foo::get("/hello/{name}", function($name) {
    return "Hello $name!";
});

Microframeworks 

 Bottle for Python
 Camping for Ruby
 Express.js for Node.js
 Falcon for Python
 Flask for Python
 Scalatra for Scala
 Lumen for PHP
 Slim for PHP
 Silex for PHP
 Sinatra for Ruby
  Spark for Java
  Jooby for Java
  Javalin for Java
  Jodd for Java
  Helidon for Java
  Pippo for Java
  Rapidoid for Java
  Armeria for Java
  Akka HTTP for Java
  Ratpack for Java
  Ktor for Kotlin
  Toolatra for Tcl

References